Hussein Moheb is a well-known Yemeni singer. He was born in 1985 in Hamdan district, Sana'a, and started singing in 2000.

External links

References

1985 births
21st-century Yemeni male singers
Living people
Yemeni composers